Eugenio Rossi (born November 10, 1969) is an Italian retired professional tennis player who won a gold medal at the 1987 Mediterranean Games. He appeared in the main draw of the 1989 Grand Prix tournament in Bari, where he defeated Michele Fioroni before losing to Alejandro Aramburu.

Junior Grand Slam finals

Doubles: 1 (1 runner-up)

ATP Challenger and ITF Futures finals

Doubles: 1 (0–1)

References

External links

Italian male tennis players
Living people
1969 births

Mediterranean Games gold medalists for Italy
Competitors at the 1987 Mediterranean Games
Mediterranean Games medalists in tennis